Brancaster Manor is a saltmarsh owned by the National Trust  near Brancaster, Norfolk covering 810 ha (2,000 acres). It was originally purchased by the Brancaster Memorial Trust in 1964, and transferred to the National Trust in 1967. It is leased to Brancaster Staithe Fishermen's Society.

It was designated as a Site of Special Scientific Interest (SSSI) in 1968, and in 1986 it was subsumed into the  North Norfolk Coast Site of Special Scientific Interest. The larger area is now additionally protected through Natura 2000, Special Protection Area (SPA) and Ramsar listings, and is part of the Norfolk Coast Area of Outstanding Natural Beauty (AONB).

References

Cited texts 

Sites of Special Scientific Interest in Norfolk
Coastal features of Norfolk
Birdwatching sites in England
Brancaster